Adele Island may refer to:

 Adele Island (New Zealand), off the northern coast of the South Island of New Zealand 
 Adele Island (Western Australia), off the Kimberley coast of Western Australia